Eudesmia trisigna is a moth of the family Erebidae first described by Francis Walker in 1854. It is found in Venezuela.

References

Eudesmia
Moths described in 1854